Nelson Bays Rugby Union was a New Zealand rugby union team that played from 1968 to 2005.

Nelson Bays was founded in 1968 when Nelson merged with Golden Bay-Motueka and played until 2005 when they joined with Marlborough to become Tasman Rugby Union in 2006.

Achievements

Ranfurly Shield 
Nelson Bays challenged for the Ranfurly Shield 6 times but were never successful.

All Blacks 
Nelson Bays had two All Blacks in their existence, Trevor James Morris and Rico Gear. Morris managed 20 games as an All Black, including three test matches, between 1972 and 1973.

Nelson Bays players 

Defunct New Zealand rugby union teams
Defunct New Zealand rugby union governing bodies
Sport in the Tasman District
Sport in the Nelson Region
1968 establishments in New Zealand